Madnapur is a town and a gram panchayat in Udham Singh Nagar district in the state of Uttarakhand, India.

Geography

Demographics
 India census, Madnapur had a population of 2856. Males constitute 52% of the population and females 48%. Madnapur has an average literacy rate of 57%, lower than the national average of 59.5%: male literacy is 55% and, female literacy is 42%. In Madnapur, 17% of the population is under 6 years of age.

References

Cities and towns in Udham Singh Nagar district